The South Pacific Scouts were a jungle warfare unit formed during World War II from Fijians and Solomon Islanders.  They participated in the American landings at New Georgia in 1943.

Notes

External links
Guerillas in the Solomons - text
Photo of Fiji guerillas in the Solomons

Pacific Ocean theatre of World War II
Solomon Islands in World War II
Fiji in World War II
Groups of World War II
Military units and formations of Fiji in World War II
Military units and formations of New Zealand in World War II
Fijian military personnel
Fiji